Jacob ben Wolf Kranz of Dubno (1741–1804), the Dubner Maggid, was a Lithuanian (Belarus)-born preacher (maggid). (Alternative spelling of family name: Kranc)

Famous fables and stories 
The Dubner Maggid is famous for his fables or parables designed to teach or illustrate an instructive lessons based on Jewish tradition. The most famous fable of the Dubner Maggid is about the way in which he was able to find such fitting fables. When asked about this the Maggid replied: Once I was walking in the forest, and saw tree after tree with a target drawn on it, and at the center of each target an arrow. I then came upon a little boy with a bow in his hand. "Are you the one who shot all these arrows?", I asked. "Yes!" he replied. "Then how did you always hit the center of the target?" I asked. "Simple," said the boy: "First I shoot the arrow, then I draw the target."

History 

Kranz was born at Zietil (Yiddish זשעטל Zhetl)(now Dzyatlava), (then Lithuania now Belarus) in about 1740 and died at Zamość on 18 December 1804. At the age of eighteen he went to Międzyrzec Podlaski (Meseritz), where he occupied the position of preacher. He stayed there for two years, and then became preacher successively at Zolkiev, Dubno, Włodawa (Lublin region), Kalisch, and Zamość. He remained at Dubno eighteen years and is best known for being the Rabbi here. He left Dubno for Vilnius at the request of the famous Elijah Wilna, who, having recently recovered from a sickness and being unable to study, sought diversion in his conversation.

Kranz was considered to be unrivalled preacher. Possessed of great eloquence, he illustrated both his sermons and his homiletic commentaries with parables taken from human life. By such parables he explained the most difficult passages of the Tanakh, and cleared up many perplexing questions in Halakha. He was also an eminent rabbinical scholar, and on many occasions was consulted as an authority.

Confronted with imposters there were several tests that Kranz would go through to prove he was the true Maggid, opening the Tanakh at random, and inventing parables on the spot.

Books 

All of Kranz's works were published after his death by Abraham Bär Flahm with the permission of Kranz's son Yitzhak Kranz who found the writings of the Maggid in Mezritch where he had preached.

 "Ohel Ya'aqov", a homiletic commentary on the Pentateuch abounding with graphic parables (i., Józefów, 1830; ii., Zolkiev, 1837; iii., Vienna, 1863; iv., 1861; v., Vienna, 1859);
 "Qol Ya'aqov" (Warsaw, 1819), a similar commentary on the Five Scrolls;
 "Kokhab mi-Ya'aqov", a commentary on the "haft'arot";
 "Emet le-Ya'aqov" (Zolkiev, 1836), a commentary on the Passover Haggadah;
 "Sefer ha-Middot" (n.p., 1862), ethics arranged in eight "gates" or sections, each section being divided into several chapters. This work resembles very much the "Hobot ha-Levavot" of Bachya.

As the author himself had given no name to it, Abraham Bär Flahm, its editor, at first intended to call it "Chobot ha-Lebabot he-Chadash" (The New Duties of the Heart, a reference to an 11th Century famous book); but out of respect for the author, Bachya, he changed his mind. The editor also revised the work, and added to it a preface containing a sketch of Kranz's life, and glosses of his own under the title "Shiyyure ha-Middot". Moses Nussbaum of Przemyśl extracted from the author's "Ohel Ya'aqob" all the parables, and published them in one book entitled "Mishle Ya'aqob" (Cracow, 1886). Following an open letter by Abraham Flahm printed in the popular Hagaddah that year, he agreed to print Flahm's preface in the succeeding reprints. The agreement is kept to this day. Several parables never published till modern times, but passed on orally in the family, have been written down by Moshe Kranc, a descendant of the Dubner Maggid, in a book about business and Jewish tales: "The Hasidic Masters' Guide to Management".

Reference Notes

Sources
 Bibliography: Sefer ha-Middot, Preface; 
 Fuenn, Keneset Yisrael, p. 543; 
 H. Margaliot, in Ha-Tzefirah, 1902, No. 8.

External links
 Beth Hatphutzoth
 The North Jerusalem Maggid of Dubno Project
 Collection of parables from the Maggid of Dubno
 Jew Dubno
Jewish Encyclopedia: "Jacob ben Wolf Kranz of Dubno (Dubner Maggid)" by Herman Rosenthal and Max Seligsohn (1906).

1740 births
1804 deaths
People from Grodno Region
Belarusian Jews
18th-century Lithuanian rabbis
People from Dzyatlava
Maggidim
Rabbis from Vilnius